Qanat Marvan (also Romanized as Qanāt Marvān, Qanāt-e Marvān, and Qanāt-e Mervān; also known as Ma'dan-e Qanāt Marvān) is a village in Bezenjan Rural District, in the Central District of Baft County, Kerman Province, Iran. At the 2006 census, its population was 18, in 9 families.

References 

Populated places in Baft County